The men's ne-waza 85 kg competition in ju-jitsu at the 2013 World Games took place on 29 July 2013 at the Evagelista Mora Coliseum in Cali, Colombia.

Results

Elimination round

Group A

Group B

Finals
{{#invoke:RoundN|N4
|widescore=yes|bold_winner=high|team-width=260
|RD1=Semifinals
|3rdplace=yes

||{{flagIOC2athlete|Dan Schon|MEX|2013 World Games}}|100||0
||{{flagIOC2athlete|Sébastien Lecocq|FRA|2013 World Games}}|2||0

||{{flagIOC2athlete|Dan Schon|MEX|2013 World Games}}|4||0

|||0|

References

Ju-jitsu at the 2013 World Games